The International Numbering System for Food Additives (INS) is a European-based naming system for food additives, aimed at providing a short designation of what may be a lengthy actual name. It is defined by Codex Alimentarius, the international food standards organisation of the World Health Organization (WHO) and Food and Agriculture Organization (FAO) of the United Nations (UN). The information is published in the  document Class Names and the International Numbering System for Food Additives, first published in 1989, with revisions in 2008 and 2011.  The INS is an open list, "subject to the inclusion of additional additives or removal of existing ones on an ongoing basis".

Numbering system
INS numbers consist of three or four digits, optionally followed by an alphabetical suffix to further characterize individual additives. On packaging in the European Union (EU), approved food additives are written with a prefix of E. An additive that appears in the INS does not automatically have a corresponding E number.

INS numbers are assigned by the committee to identify each food additive. INS numbers generally correspond to E numbers for the same compound, e.g. INS 102, Tartrazine, is also E102. INS numbers are not unique and, in fact, one number may be assigned to a group of similar compounds.

List of INS numbers

Except where stated, the list of INS numbers and associated food additives is based on the most recent publication of the Codex Alimentarius, Class Names and the International Numbering System for Food Additives, first published in 1989, with revisions in 2008 and 2011.
E number and American approval flags are derived from other sources.
In the table below, food additives approved for the EU are listed with an 'E', and those approved for Australia and New Zealand with an 'A'. and for the US with a U, even though the US does not use the INS numbering system.

See also

Codex Alimentarius
Codex Alimentarius Austriacus
E number
Food Additives
Federal Food, Drug, and Cosmetic Act
Food Chemicals Codex
List of food additives

References

Further reading 
 Codex Alimentarius
 Food Standards Australia New Zealand
 Food Additives and Ingredients Association
 Northern Allergy Centre's Guide to Food Additives
 USFDA: Food Color Facts

1989 introductions
1989 establishments
 
Food additives
Additives
Food additives, Codex Alimentarius

it:Additivi alimentari
vi:Danh sách các phụ gia thực phẩm